Mark Simms (born 1981) is a Canadian filmmaker, community activist and martial artist.

Life 
Mark Simms was born in Toronto, Ontario and grew up in Jane and Finch alongside childhood friend, Paul Nguyen. Simms is the executive producer for the community website, Jane-Finch.com. He is a 2nd Dan black belt in Taekwondo and has competed and won multiple provincial tournaments. He frequently appears as a motivational speaker and guest lecturer for events aimed at children and youth. He is a recipient of the 2011 Ontario Volunteer Service Award from the Ministry of Citizenship, Immigration and International Trade. In 2016, Simms appeared on CBC's Marketplace to investigate racism in Canada.

Media 
Simms is an outspoken advocate for the Jane and Finch community. He comments on issues of gangs, drugs and crime.
In 2006, Simms opposed the installation of police cameras in Jane and Finch on CBC's Metro Morning with Andy Barrie. In 2007, he spoke out on behalf of the Manners family during the 2007 murder of Jordan Manners.

Advocacy 
Simms has commented on various topics and issues surrounding the Jane and Finch area.
 December 28, 2005 - Simms appeared on Global News to talk about gang warfare.
 November 9, 2005 - Simms appeared on CBC News: Today with Nancy Wilson to talk about the underground documentary, 'The Real Toronto'.
 August 1, 2006 - Simms on Radio Canada International to talk about street gangs in Toronto.
 May 24, 2007, Simms appeared on CBC News Morning with Heather Hiscox to talk about the Jordan Manners shooting.
 May 24, 2007, Simms appeared on CTV's The Verdict with Paula Todd to discuss the Jordan Manners shooting.
 June 21, 2007 - Simms spoke to CBC News host Nancy Wilson about gangs and the 'no-snitch' culture.
 Summer 2007, Simms discusses his involvement with the fifth estate documentary Lost in the Struggle in the Ryerson Review of Journalism.
 October 6, 2008 - Simms appeared on the CBC French Radio program Désautel to talk about gang crime in Jane and Finch.
 January 12, 2010, Simms appeared on Sun TV to discuss Jane-Finch.com's impact to the Jane and Finch community.
 May 20, 2011, Simms spoke to host Karen Horsman on CBC's Metro Morning to express the community's feelings of the non-guilty verdict in the Jordan Manners' trial.
 February 26, 2016, Simms spoke to host Sheila Coles on CBC's Morning Edition talking about his experience with racism in Canada.

Broadcast 
Simms spent 10 months as a cameraman and associate producer documenting the lives of gang-involved youth from Jane and Finch for CBC's the fifth estate in the Gemini Award-nominated Lost in the Struggle. The film featured Vietnamese-Canadian rapper, Chuckie Akenz.
 Lost in the Struggle: The Next Chapter (associate producer) (CBC Television, the fifth estate, 2012)
 If Justice Fails (actor) (CBC Television, the fifth estate, 2007)
 Ian Jones: Activist and Artist, How the Steelpan is Changing Lives (editor) (Bravo!/Leda Serene Films, 2007)
 Lost in the Struggle (associate producer) (CBC Television, the fifth estate, 2006)

Short films 
 Uncle Bob and his Vietnamese Children (producer), Jane-Finch (2010)
 Know Your Rights (cast), Jane-Finch.com (2010)
 Hustle On by Blacus Ninjah (director), Jane-Finch.com (2005)

References

External links 
 http://www.jane-finch.com
 http://www.cbc.ca/fifth/lostinthestruggle/filmmaker.html
 http://www.cbc.ca/metromorning/episodes/2011/05/20/were-always-shafted/
 http://www.cbc.ca/news/canada/toronto/story/2007/05/24/school-shooting-070524.html
 CTV.ca
 https://nationalpost.com/news/story.html?id=62c72629-98b1-4b3e-bbb9-1e77fade5d3a&p=2
 http://thevarsity.ca/articles/15811
 http://caribbeantales.ca/heartbeat/index.php?option=com_content&task=view&id=43&Itemid=27

1981 births
Activists from Toronto
Canadian community activists
Canadian television journalists
Film directors from Toronto
Living people
Film producers from Ontario
Canadian people of Jamaican descent
Journalists from Toronto
Black Canadian filmmakers